Janet Shamlian (born May 14, 1962) is a correspondent for CBS News reporting for CBS This Morning and the CBS Evening News.   Previously, she was a correspondent for NBC News and reported for The Today Show,  NBC Nightly News and MSNBC.

Early life and education 
Born in Oak Park, Illinois, Janet Shamlian grew up in  Park Ridge, Illinois. Shamlian graduated from Maine South High School in Park Ridge, Illinois, and received a bachelor's degree in Journalism, from the Missouri School of Journalism, where she was the commencement speaker in 2016.

Professional career
In her time at CBS News, she has reported on the mass shootings at the El Paso Walmart and Gilroy Garlic Festival and the California fires.  Before joining NBC News, Shamlian was a stay at home mom to five children.  Ahead of having a family, she worked as a reporter at  WBBM-TV in Chicago, KHOU-TV and KPRC-TV, both in Houston, and WOOD-TV in Grand Rapids, Michigan.

In October, 2016, Shamlian interviewed Arianne Zucker, the actress who Donald Trump made suggestive comments about in an Access Hollywood video recorded in 2005.  Also in 2016, she reported from the scene of the Orlando nightclub shooting and from France, just hours after the 2016 Nice truck attack, where she was vacationing with her family.  Previously, she has reported on national and international events for NBC, including the Deepwater Horizon oil spill and Hurricane Katrina. In 2007, Shamlian conducted the first evening network broadcast interview with Michelle Obama, the wife of then presidential candidate Barack Obama, on the NBC Nightly News.

In July 2019, Shamlian was hired by CBS News as a correspondent based in Houston.

Personal life
Shamlian lives in Houston with her husband and has 5 children. She was a competitive figure skater as a teen and has covered the sport for NBC News. She is of Armenian and Irish descent.

References

External links
NBC Biography

American television reporters and correspondents
Television anchors from Chicago
Television anchors from Houston
Missouri School of Journalism alumni
American people of Armenian descent
American people of Irish descent
People from Park Ridge, Illinois
Living people
American women television journalists
1962 births
Journalists from Illinois
21st-century American women